HCA Healthcare is an American for-profit operator of health care facilities that was founded in 1968. It is based in Nashville, Tennessee, and, as of May 2020, owns and operates 186 hospitals and approximately 2,000 sites of care, including surgery centers, freestanding emergency rooms, urgent care centers and physician clinics in 21 states and the United Kingdom. As of 2021, HCA Healthcare is ranked #62 on the Fortune 500 rankings of the largest United States corporations by total revenue.

The company engaged in illegal accounting and other crimes in the 1990s that resulted in the payment of more than $2 billion in federal fines and other penalties, and the dismissal of the CEO Rick Scott by the board of directors.

History

Early years

Hospital Corporation of America (HCA) was founded in 1968 in Nashville, Tennessee, by  Thomas F. Frist Sr., Thomas F. Frist Jr. and Jack C. Massey. The founders envisioned a company that would bring together hospitals to deliver patient-focused care while using the combined resources of the organization to strengthen hospitals and improve the practice of medicine. The company began with Nashville's Park View Hospital, which the elder Frist had founded in 1960 with other doctors and where he was serving as chief executive.

The company included 11 hospitals when it filed its initial public offering on the New York Stock Exchange (NYSE) in 1969 and had 26 hospitals and 3,000 beds by the end of the year.

Growth and merger

The 1970s were characterized by rapid growth in the industry and for HCA Healthcare. In the early 1980s, the focus shifted to consolidation with HCA Healthcare acquiring General Care Corporation, General Health Services, Hospital Affiliates International and Health Care Corporation. By the end of 1981, the company operated 349 hospitals with more than 49,000 beds. Operating revenues had grown to $2.4 billion.

In 1987, HCA Healthcare, which had grown to operate 463 hospitals (255 owned and 208 managed), spun off HealthTrust, a privately owned, 104-hospital company. Believing its stock was undervalued, the company completed a $5.1 billion leveraged management buyout led by chairman Thomas F. Frist, Jr. in 1988. HCA Healthcare re-emerged as a public company in 1992.

In February 1994, HCA Healthcare merged with Louisville, Kentucky-based Columbia Hospital Corporation, which earlier had acquired 73 hospitals of Galen Health Care from Humana, to form Columbia/HCA. Related names of note include HCA International and Health Corporation of America.

Columbia Hospital Corporation
In 1988, Rick Scott and Richard Rainwater each put up $125,000 in working capital in their new company, Columbia Hospital Corporation; they borrowed the remaining money needed to purchase two struggling hospitals in El Paso for $60 million. Then they acquired a neighboring hospital and shut it down. Within a year, the remaining two were doing much better. By the end of 1989, Columbia Hospital Corporation owned four hospitals with a total of 833 beds.

In 1992, Columbia made a stock purchase of Basic American Medical, which owned eight hospitals, primarily in southwestern Florida. In September 1993, Columbia did another stock purchase, worth $3.4 billion, of Galen Healthcare, which had been spun off by Humana Inc. several months earlier. At the time, Galen had approximately 90 hospitals. After the purchase, Galen stockholders had 82% of the stock in the combined company, with Scott still running the company.

Recent history
On November 17, 2006, HCA became a private company for the third time when it completed a merger in which the company was acquired by a private investor group including affiliates of Kohlberg Kravis Roberts and Bain Capital, together with Merrill Lynch and HCA Healthcare founder Thomas F. Frist, Jr. The total transaction was valued at approximately $33 billion, making it the largest leveraged buyout in history at the time, eclipsing the 1989 buyout of RJR Nabisco.

In May 2010, HCA announced that the corporation would once again go public with an expected $4.6-billion IPO as HCA Holdings, Inc. In March 2011, HCA sold 126.2 million shares for $30 each, raising about $3.79 billion, at that time, the largest private-equity backed IPO in U.S. history.  In May 2017, the corporation was renamed HCA Healthcare.

In December 2018, a historical marker was installed in the parking lot of HCA's Sarah Cannon Cancer Center in Nashville, formerly the location of HCA's first hospital, Park View Hospital.

In 2018, the company was ranked No. 67 in the 2019 Fortune 500 list of the largest United States corporations by total revenue.

In May 2021, the company finalized a deal with Google to develop healthcare algorithms using patient records. In August 2021, HCA announced a deal with Venture capital firm General Catalyst to develop digital solutions to streamline workflows and improve patient care; as part of the deal, HCA sold its healthcare app development firm PatientKeeper to General Catalyst's portfolio company Commure.

In April 2022, HCA Healthcare announced a $1.5 million partnership with Florida International University’s Nicole Wertheim college of Nursing and Health Sciences, to expand its facilities to address the national nursing shortage.

In October 2022, LCMC Health in partnership with Tulane University announced that it would acquire Tulane Medical Center, Lakeview Regional Medical Center, and Tulane Lakeside Hospital from HCA for $150 million pending regulatory approval.

Facilities

United States
, HCA reports it operates 185 hospitals and more than 2,000 sites of care, including surgery centers, freestanding ERs, urgent care centers, and physician clinics located in 21 U.S. states and in the United Kingdom.  A significant portion of those hospitals are situated in Florida and Texas. As of 2022, HCA had 47 hospitals and 31 surgery centers in Florida, and 45 hospitals and 632 affiliated sites of care in Texas. In 2021, it announced plans to build 3 new hospitals in Florida. In  2022, the Dallas News reported that HCA will build 5 new hospitals in Texas. They also have a strong presence in Tennessee, where it began. HCA had 13 hospitals there as of 2019.

Between 2003 and 2017, HCA did not enter any new markets. However, in July 2007, HCA sold its hospitals in Switzerland.

In 2017, HCA acquired the Memorial University Medical Center in Savannah, Georgia. That same year, they acquired three Houston, Texas, hospitals from Tenet Healthcare.

In 2019 they purchased Mission Health System which operates hospitals in North Carolina.

In January 2020, HCA Healthcare acquired Valify, a healthcare cost-management company. In May 2020, HCA acquired 49-bed Shands Starke (Fla.) Regional Medical Center and 25-bed Shands Live Oak (Fla.) Regional Medical Center from CHS. HCA is operating the two facilities as off-campus emergency departments of Lake City (Fla.) Medical Center and North Florida Regional Medical Center in Gainesville. Later that year, it signed an agreement to sell Garden Park Medical Center to Singing River Health System.

In 2021, it sold Redmond Regional Medical Center to AdventHealth for $635M, and four other Georgia hospitals to Piedmont Healthcare for $950 million.  They also announced the acquisition of  Meadows Regional Medical Center.

United Kingdom
, the "UK arm" of Hospital Corporation of America, "caters for around half of all private patients in London." The main hospital sites within the United Kingdom it operates include:

It opened urgent care walk-in centres at London Bridge Hospital and the Portland Hospital in March 2018. It claims that patients, on average, wait just seven minutes to see a nurse and 17 minutes to see a doctor. In February 2022, outsourced cleaning staff at London Bridge Hospital reported a lack of PPE, no access to sick pay, a lack of training and no prior warning about which rooms may be contaminated with the virus through the COVID-19 pandemic.

The Princess Grace Hospital specializes in breast cancer and surgery, aided by Kefah Mokbel and Nick Perry who, in 2005, founded The London Breast Institute.

Significant areas of operation

Medical education
In recent years, HCA Healthcare has become a significant provider of clinical and medical education. It is the largest sponsor of graduate medical education programs in the U.S., with 56 teaching hospitals in 14 states, primarily in regions with a deficit of physician training programs. The company includes Research College of Nursing and Mercy School of Nursing, and has several advanced nursing simulation training centers. In early 2020, it completed the purchase of a majority stake in Galen College of Nursing, which operates five campuses and offers Bachelor of Science and Associate of Science nursing degrees.

Controversies
During the COVID-19 pandemic in the United States, HCA hospital nurses and other workers spoke out about the lack of PPE. In 2020, there was an outcry against HCA following the deaths of two nurses Celia Yap-Banago and Rosa Luna who worked at HCA hospitals in Kansas City and California and had contracted coronavirus, despite the alarm having been raised about the lack of PPE at work.

In May 2020, the Intercept reported that HCA hired professional union busters costing $400 an hour—to break up proposed union actions by nurses in North Carolina complaining of cuts in staff, poor communication, and lack of PPE.

In February 2022  cleaners at HCA's London Bridge Hospital launched a campaign calling for living wages, fair treatment, provision of PPE and an end to the bullying and overwork culture at the hospital.

In March 2022, the North Carolina Department of Justice notified the Mission Health System, an HCA system in Asheville NC, that it was “extremely concerned” about ongoing citizen complaints over high prices, lack of transparency, anti-competitive behavior, chronic under-staffing, and declining quality of care at HCA-managed medical facilities in western North Carolina.

In April 2022  Corporate Watch collated a list of HCA scandals and controversies in the USA and UK including privatisation lobbying, discrimination employment tribunals, complaints from workers, and fraud.

Physicians at HCA Bayonet Point allege that cost-cutting by HCA executives has made the hospital an unsafe environment for patients. In January 2022, there were 18 near misses among patients about to undergo surgery. In 2021, HCA executives cut the number of full-time anesthesiologists from 15 to 1. Doctors have noted unsanitary conditions, such as cockroaches in the operating room.

Legal liabilities

In 1993, lawsuits were filed against HCA by former employees who alleged that the company had engaged in questionable Medicare billing practices. In 1997, with a federal investigation by the FBI, the IRS and the Department of Health and Human Services in its early stages, the Columbia/HCA board of directors forced Rick Scott to resign as chairman and CEO amid growing evidence that the company "had kept two sets of books, one to show the government and one with actual expenses listed." Thomas Frist, a co-founder of HCA and brother of U.S. Senator Bill Frist, returned to the company as CEO in 1997 and called on longtime friend and colleague Jack O. Bovender, Jr. to help him turn the company around.

The federal probe culminated in 2003 with "the government receiving a total of over $2 billion in criminal fines and civil penalties for systematically defrauding federal health care programs."   Columbia/HCA pleaded guilty to 14 felonies and admitted to systematically overcharging the government. The federal probe has been referred to as the longest and costliest investigation for health-care fraud in U.S. history.

2005 insider trading suit
In July 2005, U.S. Senator Bill Frist sold all of his HCA shares, which were held in a blind trust, two weeks before disappointing earnings sent the stock on a 9-point plunge. At the time, Frist was considering a run for president and said that he had sold his shares to avoid the appearance of a conflict of interest.  When the company disclosed that other executives had also sold their shares during that same time, shareholders alleged that the company had made false claims about its profits to drive up the price, which then fell when the company reported disappointing financial results. Eleven of HCA's senior officers were sued for accounting fraud and insider trading. HCA settled the lawsuit in August 2007, agreeing to pay $20 million to the shareholders but admitting no wrongdoing, and no charges were brought.

See also 
 Rick Scott, former chairman and CEO, former governor of Florida, and current U.S Senator
Private medicine in the United Kingdom

References

Further reading

External links
 
 

1968 establishments in Tennessee
2011 initial public offerings
American companies established in 1968
Health care companies established in 1968
Bain Capital companies
Companies based in Nashville, Tennessee
Companies listed on the New York Stock Exchange
Frist family
 
Hospital networks in the United States
Kohlberg Kravis Roberts companies
Health care companies based in Tennessee